Fulton is a city in and the county seat of Itawamba County, Mississippi, United States. The population was 3,961 at the 2010 census.

The city is part of the Tupelo Micropolitan Statistical Area.

History

Fulton is named for Robert Fulton, inventor of the steamboat. The U.S. post office was established on July 26, 1837, marking the official launch of the service in Fulton. This was followed by incorporation on May 11, 1837.

Geography
Fulton is located west of the center of Itawamba County at  (34.266110, -88.401358). It is bordered to the west by the Tennessee–Tombigbee Waterway.

Interstate 22/U.S. Route 78 passes through the southern part of the city, with access from Exit 104 (S. Adams Street). I-22 leads west  to Tupelo and east  to Hamilton, Alabama. Mississippi Highway 25 passes through the southeastern part of Fulton, leading south  to Smithville and north  to Belmont.

Demographics

2020 census

As of the 2020 United States census, there were 4,542 people, 1,255 households, and 797 families residing in the city.

2000 census
As of the census of 2000, there were 3,882 people, 1,357 households, and 891 families residing in the city. The population density was 450.3 people per square mile (173.9/km2). There were 1,508 housing units at an average density of 174.9 per square mile (67.5/km2). The racial makeup of the city was 83.69% White, 14.61% African American, 0.23% Native American, 0.52% Asian, 0.28% from other races, and 0.67% from two or more races. Hispanic or Latino of any race were 1.26% of the population.

There were 1,357 households, out of which 26.5% had children under the age of 18 living with them, 48.3% were married couples living together, 13.9% had a female householder with no husband present, and 34.3% were non-families. 31.8% of all households were made up of individuals, and 16.5% had someone living alone who was 65 years of age or older. The average household size was 2.29 and the average family size was 2.88.

In the city, the population was spread out, with 18.7% under the age of 18, 21.3% from 18 to 24, 20.9% from 25 to 44, 19.3% from 45 to 64, and 19.8% who were 65 years of age or older. The median age was 35 years. For every 100 females, there were 83.5 males. For every 100 females aged 18 and over, there were 82.8 males.

The median income for a household in the city was $29,449, and the median income for a family was $42,287. Males had a median income of $33,490 versus $23,278 for females. The per capita income for the city was $15,540. About 9.7% of families and 16.9% of the population were below the poverty line, including 21.4% of those under age 18 and 17.2% of those age 65 or over.

Education
Fulton is served by the Itawamba County School District.

Media
 W39CA-D Channel 39 TV is a Unity Broadcasting Network station.

Infrastructure
The Mississippian Railway provides rail service to local companies. The Tennessee–Tombigbee Waterway provides water transportation for industries in Fulton.

Notable people
 Donnie Bell, member of the Mississippi House of Representatives
 Brian Dozier, Major League Baseball infielder
 Roy Gregory, former head football coach for Austin Peay State University
 Jimmie Lunceford, jazz alto saxophonist and bandleader in the swing era
 Ally Ewing (nee McDonald), professional golfer on LPGA Tour
 Maikhail Miller, former American football quarterback
 Vernon Presley, father of Elvis Presley
Chad Ramey, professional golfer who plays on the PGA Tour
 Lyonel Thomas Senter Jr., U.S. federal judge
 Samuel M. Taylor, congressman from Arkansas
 Peggy Welch, member of the Indiana House of Representatives

References

External links

 
 
 Lee-Itawamba Library System

1837 establishments in Mississippi
Cities in Itawamba County, Mississippi
Cities in Mississippi
Cities in Tupelo micropolitan area
County seats in Mississippi
Populated places established in 1837